Bollingen may refer to:
Bollingen, a village in Rapperswil-Jona
Bollinger Sandstein, sandstone from the upper Lake Zürich (Obersee) area
Bollingen Foundation, an educational foundation 
Bollingen Prize, awarded by Beinecke Library at Yale University
Bollingen Series, a book series published by Princeton University Press

See also
Bollingen Tower, located in Bollingen, built by psychiatrist Carl Jung
Andrew W. Mellon Foundation, which currently holds most assets of the Bollingen Foundation
Paul Mellon